Harry J. Mehre (September 18, 1901 – September 27, 1978) was an American football and basketball player and coach.  He served as the head football coach at the University of Georgia (1928–1937) and the University of Mississippi (1938–1945), compiling a career college football record of 98–60–7.  Mehre also served as the head coach of the Minneapolis Marines of the NFL in 1923, tallying a mark of 4–5–2.

Early years and education
Harry Mehre was born in Huntington, Indiana on September 10, 1901. Mehre attended the University of Notre Dame and played center on both the football and basketball teams (serving as co-captain for the 1919–1920 basketball team and captain of the 1920–1921 team).

Sports career
After Mehre graduated in 1922, he played in that year and in 1923 with the Minneapolis Marines, also serving as head coach in 1923. Mehre was also a football line coach and head basketball coach at the University of St. Thomas in St. Paul, Minnesota.

In 1924, Mehre came to the University of Georgia as an assistant coach under George Woodruff.  Upon Woodruff's retirement, Mehre became head coach and compiled a 59–34–6 record over ten years. He also was Georgia's athletic director.  After leaving Georgia, Mehre served as the head coach at the University of Mississippi from 1938 to 1945, compiling a 39–26–1 record there.

Death and legacy
Mehre was inducted into the Georgia Sports Hall of Fame in 1971.  He died in Atlanta in 1978. In 1986, Butts–Mehre Heritage Hall was dedicated on the University of Georgia campus in honor of Mehre and fellow Bulldogs coach Wally Butts.

Head coaching record

College

References

External links
 History of the University of Georgia, Thomas Walter Reed, Imprint: Athens, Georgia : University of Georgia, ca.1949, pp.3543-3561
 New Georgia Encyclopedia entry for George Woodruff

1901 births
1978 deaths
American football centers
Centers (basketball)
Georgia Bulldogs football coaches
Minneapolis Marines coaches
Minneapolis Marines players
Notre Dame Fighting Irish men's basketball players
Notre Dame Fighting Irish football players
Ole Miss Rebels athletic directors
Ole Miss Rebels football coaches
St. Thomas (Minnesota) Tommies football coaches
People from Huntington, Indiana
Basketball players from Indiana
American men's basketball players